Stéphane Dakowski (29 June 1921 – 11 July 2016) was a French footballer. He played in two matches for the France national football team in 1951. He was also part of France's team for their qualification matches for the 1954 FIFA World Cup.

References

External links
 

1921 births
2016 deaths
French footballers
France international footballers
People from Provins
Association football goalkeepers
FC Sète 34 players
Nîmes Olympique players
FC Nantes players